Rahman Davoudi (born February 18, 1988, in Malayer), is an Iranian volleyball player who plays for Matin Varamin and  Iran men's national volleyball team.

Honours

National team
Asian Championship
Gold medal (1): 2013
Silver medal (1): 2015
Asian Cup
Gold medal (1): 2016
U21 World Championship
Bronze medal (1): 2007
Asian U20 Championship
Gold medal (1): 2006
Asian U18 Championship
Gold medal (1): 2005

Individual
Best Outside Spiker: 2016 Asian Cup

References

External links
FIVB profile

People from Qazvin
Iranian men's volleyball players
1988 births
Living people